Andleeb Abbas is a Pakistani politician who has been a member of the National Assembly of Pakistan from August 2018 till January 2023.

Political career
She ran for the seat of the Senate of Pakistan as a candidate of Pakistan Tehreek-e-Insaf (PTI) in 2018 Pakistani Senate election but was unsuccessful. She received 46 votes and lost the seat to Nuzhat Sadiq.

She was elected to the National Assembly of Pakistan as a candidate of PTI on a reserved seat for women from Punjab in 2018 Pakistani general election.

On 27 September 2018, Prime Minister Imran Khan appointed her as Federal Parliamentary Secretary for Foreign Affairs.

Personal life
Andleeb's husband Nasir Abbas is a former first-class cricketer who played for Faisalabad and Hafizabad as a bowler. They have a daughter, Zainab Abbas, who is a television sports presenter.

References

Living people
Year of birth missing (living people)
Pakistan Tehreek-e-Insaf MNAs
Pakistani MNAs 2018–2023
Women members of the National Assembly of Pakistan
21st-century Pakistani women politicians